Internet Histories is an academic journal of the history of the internet. It is indexed in Scopus.

References

Computer science journals